Spain B was a secondary football team run occasionally as support for the Spain national football team. They commonly played matches against 'B' teams from other football associations, from 1949 to 1981.

Early history
Spain B's first game is considered by some to be the one on 29 May 1927 at the Metropolitan Stadium in Madrid, where they beat the Portugal A team 2-0, thanks to second-half goals from Francisco Moraleda and Manuel Valderrama. The team that started that day was Guillermo Eizaguirre, Miguel Garrobé, Emilio Perelló, Ramón Polo Pardo, Manuel Valderrama, Gonzalo, Domingo Carulla, Enrique Molina, Pedro Regueiro, Emili Sagi-Barba and Óscar, and the two substitutes that came after the break were Matías Aranzábal and Francisco Moraleda, with the latter scoring the opening goal. However, the Spain B team was only officially created 22 years later, in 1949, by the hands of the then national coach, Guillermo Eizaguirre, who had been the starting goalkeeper in the 1927 match. A Coruña was the city chosen to host this team's first-ever match against the Portuguese, and the Spanish B team won again, 5-2. And those who have played for the Spanish side that day include the likes of a young Estanislau Basora, Silvestre Igoa (scored twice) and Miguel Muñoz, all of whom future Spanish stars. The next game was played only four years later, in 1953, this time thanks to Ricardo Zamora (the then Spain coach), to give the possibility to test under-21 or less experienced players, in addition to those involved with the senior national team.

Mediterranean Cup
Between 1953 and 1960 was when more games were held. A total of 17, divided between 8 friendlies and 9 Mediterranean Cup games. Spain B participated in the 1953-58 Mediterranean Cup, where they faced the A teams of Turkey, Egypt and Greece home and away, as well as the B teams of Italy and France, but Spain showed great character and won the tournament with 5 points to spare, finishing with 8 wins, 1 draw and 1 defeat, with their only loss in the tournament coming at the hands of Greece (0-2) in Athens on 13 March 1957, which was a huge upset as Spain had beat them 7-1 at home. The top goal scorer of the tournament was Manuel Badenes with 8 goals courtesy of two pokers, the first in a 7-1 win over Greece on 13 March 1955 and the other in a 5-1 win over Egypt on 27 November of the same year. These 8 goals also makes him the all-time top goal scorer of the Spain B team.

1982 World Cup
Preparing the squad for the 1982 World Cup in Spain, the then Spanish coach, José Santamaría and the then Spanish U-21 coach, Luis Suárez, put together a block of 7 Friendly tests throughout 1980 and 1981, and in this block, Javier Urruticoechea established himself as a goalkeeper, playing 5 of the 7 games. The squad of this B side was Javier Urruticoechea, Francisco García, Marcos Alonso, Juan José Rubio, Ricardo Gallego, Francisco Pineda, Antonio Maceda, Manuel Jiménez, Víctor Muñoz, Cundi, Periko Alonso, Pichi Alonso, Dani, Julio Alberto, Gerardo Miranda, Santillana and Juan José. The most recent fixture was a friendly against Poland B on 18 November 1981, which ended in a 2-0 with two goals from Pichi Alonso.

Results

Spain national football B team head to head

Player records

Top appearances

Note: Club(s) represents all the clubs that players played in at the time they did it too in the Bs.

Top goalscorers

Note: Club(s) represents all the clubs that players played in at the time they did it too in the Bs.

Honours
Mediterranean Cup Champion: 1953-58

Notes

References

External links 
 La Selección Española y sus Entradas
 Tructiepbongda

B-team
European national B association football teams